The 2015 FedEx 400 benefiting Autism Speaks was a NASCAR Sprint Cup Series race held on May 31, 2015, at Dover International Speedway in Dover, Delaware. Contested over 405 laps – extended by five laps due to a green-white-checkered finish – on the 1 mile (1.6 km) concrete speedway, it was the 13th race of the 2015 NASCAR Sprint Cup Series season. Jimmie Johnson won the race, his fourth win of the season and tenth at Dover, while Kevin Harvick finished second and Kyle Larson finished third. Kasey Kahne and Aric Almirola rounded out the top five.

Denny Hamlin scored the pole for the race and led 118 laps on his way to a 21st-place finish after being caught up in a late race wreck. Martin Truex Jr. led the most laps for the third consecutive race on his way to a sixth-place finish. The race had 15 lead changes among nine different drivers, as well as seven caution flag periods for 40 laps.

This was the 74th career victory for Jimmie Johnson, tenth at Dover International Speedway – becoming the fifth driver to win ten or more races at one race track – and 18th at the track for Hendrick Motorsports. This win moved Jimmie Johnson up to third in the points standings. Chevrolet left Dover with a 51-point lead over Ford in the manufacturer standings.

The FedEx 400 benefiting Autism Speaks was carried by Fox Sports on the cable/satellite Fox Sports 1 network for the American television audience. The radio broadcast for the race was carried by the Motor Racing Network and Sirius XM NASCAR Radio.

Report

Background
Dover International Speedway (formerly Dover Downs International Speedway) is a race track in Dover, Delaware, United States. Since opening in 1969, it has held at least two NASCAR races. In addition to NASCAR, the track also hosted USAC and the Verizon IndyCar Series. The track features one layout, a  concrete oval, with 24° banking in the turns and 9° banking on the straights. The speedway is owned and operated by Dover Motorsports.

The track, nicknamed "The Monster Mile", was built in 1969 by Melvin Joseph of Melvin L. Joseph Construction Company, Inc., with an asphalt surface, but was replaced with concrete in 1995. Six years later in 2001, the track's capacity moved to 135,000 seats, making the track have the largest capacity of sports venue in the mid-Atlantic. In 2002, the name changed to Dover International Speedway from Dover Downs International Speedway after Dover Downs Gaming and Entertainment split, making Dover Motorsports. From 2007 to 2009, the speedway worked on an improvement project called "The Monster Makeover", which expanded facilities at the track and beautified the track. After the 2014 season, the track's capacity was reduced to 95,500 seats.

Kevin Harvick entered Dover with a 41-point lead over Martin Truex Jr. Joey Logano entered 66 back. Joey Logano entered 62 back. Dale Earnhardt Jr. entered 72 back. Jimmie Johnson entered 80 back.

Tires
Goodyear provided teams with a newly constructed left-side tire compound intended to provide more grip. Teams were also given nine sets of tires for the race instead of the normal eleven.

Penalties from Charlotte
Following two consecutive weeks of failing to pass qualifying tech inspection on the first attempt, the No. 48 Hendrick Motorsports Chevrolet and the No. 51 HScott Motorsports Chevrolet teams were to be relegated to having the last pit stall selections after the completion of qualifying. The 48 team, however, appealed the penalty and will pick in the order they qualify.

Entry list
The entry list for the FedEx 400 was released on Monday, May 25 at 12:41 p.m. Eastern time. Forty-five drivers were entered for the race. The only car with a different driver than the previous week's Coca-Cola 600 is Brian Scott. He returned to the seat of the No. 33 Hillman-Circle Sport LLC Chevrolet.

First practice

Qualifying

"It's so special, especially during FedEx 400 weekend," said Hamlin, who drives the FedEx Toyota. I was really more optimistic about our race trim than what I was our qualifying. Very optimistic that hopefully we can put this FedEx Cares Camry in Victory Lane where it belongs on Sunday." "Missed it a little bit, but obviously proud of the continued effort of all of the guys on the Furniture Row team," Martin Truex Jr. said. "Another awesome race car. It felt like we were just OK in practice, it didn't feel like we were a front row car. We made some adjustments and they hit it damn near perfect. We just needed a little bit." “Momentum is kind of on our side,” Greg Biffle said. “We are getting the car to drive better, getting a little better setup under it and working on our chassis back at the shop. We will continue to make these small gains and hopefully going into Pocono, Indy and Michigan we will see if we can get it up in the top-five. We are in the top-10 now, we need the top-five.” Jeff Green and Travis Kvapil failed to qualify for the race.

Qualifying results

Practice (post-qualifying)

Second practice

Final practice

Dale Earnhardt Jr. had fluid leaking from his car that splashed all over the apron at the exit of pit road. His crew fixed the leak and he returned to the track to finish the session.

Race

First half

Start
The race was scheduled to start at 1:15 p.m. but started two minutes later when Denny Hamlin led the field to the green flag. By lap 20, he caught the tail end of the field and saw his lead begin to shrink to Martin Truex Jr. After being held up by Justin Allgaier, Hamlin lost the lead to Truex Jr. on lap 45. By lap 60, Kevin Harvick began reeling in the leader. But Truex Jr. started pulling away again. Debris in turn 1 brought out the first caution on lap 74. This was the longest green flag run to start a race in the 2015 season. Hamlin reclaimed the lead by exiting pit road first.

Green flag run
The race restarted on lap 80. For the first few laps, Truex Jr. kept Hamlin from getting a big lead, but as the field caught the tail end of the field, Hamlin jumped to a bigger lead. Eventually, Truex Jr. took back the lead on lap 145. The second round of pit stops began on lap 150 when Clint Bowyer hit pit road. Truex Jr. surrendered the lead to pit on lap 158 and gave it to Hamlin. He pitted on lap 160 and handed the lead to teammate Carl Edwards. He pitted on lap 162 and handed the lead to Dale Earnhardt Jr. The second caution flew on lap 163 when Ricky Stenhouse Jr. had a tire blow out and slammed the wall in turn 2. David Gilliland was tagged for speeding on pit road during the green flag stops and was forced to serve a drive-through penalty. Edwards was tagged for taking equipment out of the pit box after the wrench used to adjust the track bar got stuck in the hole and restarted the race from the tail end of the field.

Trouble on the front stretch

The race restarted on lap 169 with Truex Jr. in the lead. The third caution of the race flew on lap 176 for a 3-car wreck on the front stretch. This began when Trevor Bayne, while exiting turn 4, was moving up the track and got turned by Michael Annett. He overcorrected, turned down, and hit the inside wall. Annett continued to ride the wall before getting rear-ended by Allgaier. Annett continued on, but Allgaier did not. While Truex opted not to pit, most of the cars on the lead lap behind him did.

Second half

Halfway
The race restarted on lap 185. The field got strung out until the next round of pit stops on lap 247. Truex Jr. hit pit road on lap 248 and handed the lead to Kyle Busch. He made his stop on lap 251 and gave the lead to Hamlin. He served his stop on lap 258 and the lead cycled to Harvick. Edwards and Earnhardt Jr. were tagged for speeding on pit road and served drive-though penalties. Annett was tagged for an uncontrolled tire and served a drive-through penalty. The uncontrolled tire came to a rest at the outside pit wall and brought out the fourth caution of the race on lap 261. During this caution period, the concrete pit box that Tony Stewart occupied was beginning to come apart.

Final round of pit stops
The race restarted on lap 268 with Truex leading the way. Harvick took the lead the next lap. After ten laps, he pulled to a 1.8-second lead over the No. 78 car. Matt Kenseth was running fifth when he made an unscheduled stop on lap 307. He returned to the track the 22nd position, two laps down. The final round of green flag pit stops began on lap 325 when Kevin Harvick gave up the lead to pit and gave it to Kyle Busch, who pitted on lap 329 and gave the lead to Clint Bowyer. Then, Bowyer hit pit road and gave the lead to Brad Keselowski. Danica Patrick and Josh Wise were tagged for speeding on pit road and were forced to serve a drive-through penalty.

50 laps to go

Brad Keselowski made his final stop with 43 laps to go and the lead cycled to Kevin Harvick. The fifth caution of the race flew with 25 laps to go for a two car wreck. Going through turn 3, Kyle Busch tried to pass Brian Scott when both cars slid up the track and slammed the wall. "I guess Brian said his spotter didn't say anything, and he just chopped the corner," Busch said. "I was under him already and it just sucked me around. I just hate it and I hate it for my guys. Man, we had a really good run going. Obviously, we ran in the top five all day long." Harvick and Johnson opted to stay out while third place Martin Truex Jr. and the rest of the lead lap cars pitted.

Carnage in the closing laps
The race restarted with 17 laps to go. Jimmie Johnson jumped ahead of Harvick and took the lead. The sixth caution of the race flew with 15 laps to go for a second two car wreck on the backstretch. Exiting turn 2, Hamlin got tapped by Bowyer. He turned down and back up the banking and clipped Kurt Busch.

The race restarted with ten laps to go. The seventh caution of the race flew with two laps to go for a third two car wreck in turn 4. The wreck collected A. J. Allmendinger and Casey Mears.

Green-White-Checker
The race restarted with two laps to go. Johnson shot ahead of teammate Kasey Kahne and held off Harvick to score his tenth career win at Dover. He became the fifth driver to have 10 or more wins at a single track.

Post-race

Post-race comments
“God, just driving hard and working that track bar adjuster as much as I could,” Johnson said. “I was trying to be smart with my line and I guess guys on two tires weren’t all that fast. Chad (Knaus, crew chief) said something to be about that on the radio and they never really came, you know? The No. 4 (Harvick) and I did just fine on old tires and held those guys off. It was a long-fought day.” Aric Almirola scored his first top ten finish of the season with a fifth-place finish. “I am proud of (crew chief) Trent Owens and all the guys at Richard Petty Motorsports,” Almirola said. “They have been working their guts out trying to bring better cars to the race track week in and week out.” After leading the most laps for the third straight race, Martin Truex Jr. finished sixth. “We had a good car today but it was never right,” Truex Jr. said. “We were never right yesterday all through practice. We made some changes today and we made some gains on it, but never really got it where we needed it. Clean air was huge. When we were out front, we were okay. It just never turned good all day long. It eventually caught up to us.”

Post-race penalties
On the following Wednesday, NASCAR announced penalties stemming from Dover International Speedway that affect two race teams. The first is a personal conduct penalty that affects Trevor Bayne for exiting his wrecked car before he was cleared to do so by track safety officials. This violates sections 12.1, 12.8 b and 10.4.2.1 in the 2015 NASCAR rule book. He was fined $20,000 and placed on probation through the end of the calendar year.

The No. 4 team was assessed a P1 level penalty for receiving written warnings in two consecutive events (Section 12.5.3.1b,c NASCAR rule book). The team received the last choice in the pit selection process for the following weekend's event at Pocono Raceway.

Race results

Race statistics
15 lead changes among 9 different drivers
7 cautions for 40 laps
Time of race: 3 hours, 23 minutes, 16 seconds
Average speed: 
Jimmie Johnson took home $305,826 in winnings

Race awards
 Coors Light Pole Award: Denny Hamlin (22.483)
 3M Lap Leader: Martin Truex Jr. (131 laps)
 American Ethanol Green Flag Restart Award: Martin Truex Jr.
 Duralast Brakes "Bake In The Race" Award: Kevin Harvick
 Freescale "Wide Open": Kevin Harvick
 Ingersoll Rand Power Move: Kyle Larson (7 positions)
 MAHLE Clevite Engine Builder of the Race: Hendrick Engines, #42
 Mobil 1 Driver of the Race: Martin Truex Jr. (130.3 driver rating)
 Moog Steering and Suspension Problem Solver of The Race: Kasey Kahne (crew chief Keith Rodden (-0.083))
 NASCAR Sprint Cup Leader Bonus: No winner: rolls over to $100,000 at next event
 Sherwin-Williams Fastest Lap: Denny Hamlin (Lap 2, 22.879)
 Sunoco Rookie of The Race: Brett Moffitt

Media

Television
Fox Sports covered their 15th race at Dover International Speedway. Mike Joy, former crew chief Larry McReynolds and two-time Dover winner Darrell Waltrip had the call in the booth for the race. Jamie Little, Chris Neville and Matt Yocum handled the pit road duties for the television side.

Radio
MRN had the radio call for the race, which was simulcast on Sirius XM NASCAR Radio. Joe Moore, Jeff Striegle and three-time Dover winner Rusty Wallace called the race in the booth when the field went racing down the front stretch. Mike Bagley called the race from the Monster Mile suites when the field went racing down the backstretch. Alex Hayden, Glenn Jarrett and Steve Post worked pit road for MRN.

Standings after the race

Drivers' Championship standings

Manufacturers' Championship standings

Note: Only the first sixteen positions are included for the driver standings.

Note

References

FedEx 400
FedEx 400
FedEx